Seich may refer to:
 Seich, a commune in the Hautes-Pyrénées department of France
 Stephanie Seich (born 1989), American gymnast.

Seiche may refer to:
 Seiche, a standing wave in a body of water
 Seiche (river), a river in Brittany, France, which is a tributary of the Vilaine
 seiche, a French term for a cuttlefish or bobtail squid.

Seiches may refer to:
 Seiches-sur-le-Loir, a commune in the Maine-et-Loire department of France.

Seyches is a commune in the Lot-et-Garonne department of France.

Seitsch is the German name of Siciny, a village in Poland.

Siech may refer to:
 Birte Siech (born 1967), German rower.

Sietch is a locality  in the fictional Dune universe created by Frank Herbert.

See also 
 Sech (disambiguation)
 Sache (disambiguation)
 Saitch